Niekarmia  (dt:Niekarm) is a village in the administrative district of Gmina Rudziniec, within Gliwice County, Silesian Voivodeship, in southern Poland.

The village has a population of 138.

References

Niekarmia